The 2014 Colorado gubernatorial election was held on November 4, 2014, to elect the Governor and Lieutenant Governor of Colorado, concurrently with the election to Colorado's Class II U.S. Senate seat, as well as other elections to the United States Senate in other states and elections to the United States House of Representatives and various state and local elections.

Incumbent Democratic Governor John Hickenlooper and Lieutenant Governor Joseph García were re-elected to a second term in office, narrowly defeating Republican former U.S. Representative Bob Beauprez and his running mate, Douglas County Commissioner Jill Repella, by 68,000 votes.

Democratic primary
John Hickenlooper was the only Democrat to file to run, and thus at the Democratic state assembly on April 12, 2014, he was renominated unopposed.

Candidates

Nominee
 John Hickenlooper, incumbent Governor

Results

Republican primary
At the Republican state assembly on April 12, 2014, Mike Kopp and Scott Gessler received 34% and 33% of the votes of over 3,900 delegates, respectively, thus winning a place on the ballot. Greg Brophy, Steve House and Roni Bell Sylvester received 19%, 13% and 2%, respectively, falling short of the 30% needed to qualify for the ballot. Bob Beauprez and Tom Tancredo did not contest the assembly vote, instead petitioning their way onto the ballot.

Candidates

Declared
 Bob Beauprez, former U.S. Representative and nominee for governor in 2006
 Scott Gessler, Secretary of State of Colorado
 Mike Kopp, former Minority Leader of the Colorado Senate
Running mate: Vera Ortegon, biologist and former Pueblo City Councillor
 Tom Tancredo, former U.S. Representative and Constitution Party nominee for governor in 2010

Eliminated at convention
 Greg Brophy, state senator
 Steve House, healthcare consultant and Chairman of the Adams County Republican Party
 Roni Bell Sylvester, rancher

Withdrew
 Jason Clark, money manager and independent candidate for governor in 2010
 Steve Laffey, former Mayor of Cranston, Rhode Island and candidate for the U.S. Senate from Rhode Island in 2006 (running for CO-04)

Declined
 George Brauchler, Arapahoe County District Attorney
 Dan Caplis, radio host
 Cory Gardner, U.S. Representative (running for the U.S. Senate)
 Jennifer George, attorney
 Cheri Gerou, state representative
 Victor Mitchell, former state representative
 Ellen Roberts, state senator
 Bob Schaffer, former U.S. Representative, candidate for the U.S. Senate in 2004 and nominee for the U.S. Senate in 2008
 Lang Sias, former Navy fighter pilot (running for the State Senate)
 Walker Stapleton, Colorado State Treasurer (running for re-election)
 John Suthers, Colorado Attorney General

Endorsements

Polling

 * Poll for the Bob Beauprez campaign

Results

Libertarian primary

Candidates

Nominee
 Matthew Hess, IT systems administrator

Green primary

Candidates
 Harry Hempy, software engineer and progressive activist

Unsuccessful
 Bill Bartlett, co-chair of the Green Party of Colorado

Independents

Candidates

Declared
 Mike Dunafon, Mayor of Glendale
Paul N. Fiorino, performing arts teacher and perennial candidate

Withdrew
 Jim Rundberg, businessman

General election

Candidates
 John Hickenlooper (D), incumbent Governor
 Running mate: Joseph García, incumbent lieutenant governor
 Bob Beauprez (R), former U.S. Representative and nominee for governor in 2006
 Running mate: Jill Repella, Douglas County Commissioner
 Mike Dunafon (I), Mayor of Glendale
 Running mate: Robin Roberts, president of Pikes Peak National Bank
 Paul Fiorino (I), performing arts teacher, former director of the Pueblo Ballet and Independent candidate for governor in 2006 and 2010
 Running mate: Charles Whitley, retired military, arts advocate and publisher
 Matthew Hess (L), IT systems administrator
 Running mate: Brandon Young, photographer, graphic designer and political activist
 Harry Hempy (G), software engineer and progressive activist
 Running mate: Scott Olson
Marcus Giavanni (Write-in), internet developer, entrepreneur, musician
Running mate: Joshua Yballa

Debates
Complete video of debate, September 30, 2014 - C-SPAN
Complete video of debate, October 6, 2014 - C-SPAN
Complete video of debate, October 24, 2014 - C-SPAN

Predictions

Polling

Results
Throughout the night, the race was very close. With 90% of the vote in, Beauprez was about 3,000 votes ahead. The Democrats were holding out hope that Jefferson County would edge them out. When 96% of the vote had reported, Hickenlooper prevailed. Beauprez conceded defeat at 5:48 am on the morning of November 6.

References

External links
Colorado gubernatorial election, 2014 at Ballotpedia
Campaign contributions at FollowTheMoney.org
Official campaign websites (Archived)
 John Hickenlooper incumbent
 Bob Beauprez
 Mike Dunafon
 Scott Gessler
 Harry Hempy
 Matthew Hess
 Mike Kopp
 Jim Rundberg
 Tom Tancredo

Gubernatorial
2014
Colorado
John Hickenlooper